Benny Dees (December 29, 1934 – March 23, 2021) was an American college basketball coach. He was head coach of the University of New Orleans Privateers team from 1985 to 1987, the University of Wyoming team from 1987 to 1993 and Western Carolina University from 1993 to 1995. Additionally, Dees served as assistant coach at Georgia Tech, Alabama, and Western Kentucky. In 1987, he led the University of New Orleans to their first NCAA Championship tournament, where they defeated BYU in the first round 83–79.

While attending college at the University of Wyoming, Dees lettered in basketball and baseball. He began his coaching career as head coach of Abraham Baldwin Agricultural College from 1962 to 1967. Dees subsequently became the first coach of VCU. Upon retirement, Dees returned to his native Georgia, where he coached high school basketball. He retired as head coach of the Toombs County High School boys' basketball team in 2010. Dees was married to Nancy Dees, who coached women's basketball at the University of West Georgia. Benny and Nancy Dees have one son, Josh Dees, who played basketball for the University of Wyoming and Western Carolina University and now serves as assistant coach at the College of Southern Idaho.

Dees died on March 23, 2021, at the age of 86.

Head coaching record

College

References

1934 births
2021 deaths
Alabama Crimson Tide men's basketball coaches
American men's basketball coaches
American men's basketball players
Basketball coaches from Georgia (U.S. state)
Basketball players from Georgia (U.S. state)
Georgia Tech Yellow Jackets men's basketball coaches
High school basketball coaches in the United States
New Orleans Privateers men's basketball coaches
VCU Rams men's basketball coaches
Western Carolina Catamounts men's basketball coaches
Western Kentucky Hilltoppers basketball coaches
Wyoming Cowboys baseball players
Wyoming Cowboys basketball coaches
Wyoming Cowboys basketball players